Teşvikiye is one of the four neighbourhoods (together with Maçka, Osmanbey and Pangaltı) within the Nişantaşı quarter of the Şişli district in Istanbul, Turkey. 

According to the 2000 census, the population of the neighbourhood was 11,598.

The neighborhood of Teşvikiye and its historical center near the well known Teşvikiye Mosque is a upscale area which has many cafes, stores, artwork exhibitions, and creative works of fashion.

The area is also home to many beautiful Art Nouveau style buildings built at around the years of 1900-1920.

Images from Teşvikiye

See also
 Teşvikiye Mosque
 Nişantaşı

References

 Municipality of Şişli - Teşvikiye neighbourhood

Neighbourhoods of Şişli